The fourth season of Smallville, an American television series, began airing on September 22, 2004. The series recounts the early adventures of Kryptonian Clark Kent as he adjusts to life in the fictional town of Smallville, Kansas, during the years before he becomes Superman. The fourth season comprises 22 episodes and concluded its initial airing on May 18, 2005. Regular cast members during season four include Tom Welling, Kristin Kreuk, Michael Rosenbaum, Jensen Ackles, Allison Mack, John Glover, Annette O'Toole and John Schneider. 

Season four chronicles Clark and his classmates' senior year of high school and centers on his attempt to unite the three stones of knowledge, and trying to cope with Lana's new relationship with Jason Teague. Clark's friendship with Lex becomes increasingly strained, as he begins to distrust Lex more and more. At the end of season 3, Sam Jones III left the series as Pete Ross, and Jensen Ackles was brought in as Jason Teague and given star billing. Erica Durance was cast as Lois Lane, and became a recurring character for 13 episodes. Writers also brought in other popular DC Comics characters, such as Bart Allen, Mister Mxyzptlk, and Sam and Lucy Lane.

Smallville'''s Season four slipped in the ratings, averaging at 4.4 million viewers a week.

Episodes

Awards
The fourth season garnered Leo Awards. Make-up artist Natalie Cosco was awarded the Leo Award for Best Make-Up, for her work on the episode "Scare". In 2006, Barry Donlevy took home Best Cinematography in a Dramatic Series for his work on "Spirit", while David Wilson won Best Production Design in a Dramatic Series for "Sacred". The series was recognized by the Visual Effects Society with a nomination in the 2005 VES Awards and 2006 VES Awards. The 2005 nomination was for Outstanding Created Environment for "Crusade", while the 2006 nomination was for Outstanding Visual Effects in the episode "Commencement". The show received Teen Choice Award nominations in 2005 for Choice TV Actor (Tom Welling), Choice Parental Units (John Schneider and Annette O'Toole), and Choice Sidekick (Allison Mack). In 2005, the show was nominated for a Golden Reel Award for Best Sound Editing in "Scare". In 2005, "Commencement" was nominated for an Outstanding Sound Editing Emmy Award. Glen Winter's cinematography work was recognized with an American Society of Cinematographers Award for "Sacred". For the 31st Annual Saturn Awards, Tom Welling received a nomination for Best Actor, Michael Rosenbaum and Erica Durance received nominations for Best Supporting Actor/Actress, and the fourth season was nominated for Best Network Television Series.

 Home media release 
The complete fourth season of Smallville was released on September 13, 2005 in North America. Additional releases in region 2 and region 4 took place on October 10, 2005 and November 11, 2006, respectively. The DVD box set included various special features, including episode commentary, a behind-the-scenes featurette on the writers, a featurette on the different actress to have portrayed Lois Lane over the years, and DVD-ROM linking to Smallville'' websites.

References

External links

 
 
 List of Smallville season 4 episodes at Wikia
 
 List of Smallville season 4 guide at kryptonsite.com

4
2004 American television seasons
2005 American television seasons